Mother is a 1999 Indian comedy film, produced & directed by Saawan Kumar under his Saawan Kumar production banner. Starring Rekha in the title role, along with Jeetendra, Randhir Kapoor, Rakesh Roshan in the pivotal roles and music composed by Dilip Sen-Samir Sen. The film is based on the American film Buona Sera, Mrs. Campbell. This film marked the debut of Sanober Kabir. Randhir Kapoor made a comeback to acting with this film after 12 years. It was also the last film in which Rakesh Roshan played a major role. The film is best known for a scene which features the word 'class' repeatedly.

Plot
The film begins in Mauritius where a woman Mrs. Aasha Britannia a social worker holds high esteem in society. She dotes on her daughter Jiya as ever. Once, Aasha is aware of the silver jubilee celebrations of their city hospital, and people strived hard for its development is arriving from India. In tandem, she gets letters from three different persons Sunil Malik, Kumar Singh & Amar Khanna informing their visit. Panic-stricken, Aasha divulges the past to her well-wishers Maria & Johnny.

About 19 years ago, when Aasha's father is terminally ill, she forcibly turns to worse to save him and intimated with these 3 persons. But her sacrifice is to no avail, and additionally, she becomes pregnant. Then, Mrs. Chowdary a social reformer suggests starting a new life and providing integrity to her child. Hence, Aasha shifts and falsifies everyone by creating a non-existent person Mr. Britannia as her husband. Further, forges him as a plucky one that died in rescuing many Indians from the capsizing ship. Aasha also messages the trio separately as she is carrying their child and they are financially supporting her till today. Indeed, Aasha too is unbeknownst to Jiya’s real father. Besides, Raj grandson of Mrs. Chowdary falls for Jiya. Apart from, Nisha the techy, daughter of a millionaire Dhanraj infatuated with Raj. So, Dhanraj uses a crafty Sunder Das to split the love birds. Meanwhile, the trio lands along with their respective family when a comic puzzlement starts, Aasha shuffles and tries to handle the predicament. Hereupon, Aasha is bestowed with the Best Mother of the Year award for her service.

At this point, the truth breaks out when Jiya denounces her mother whereby, Aasha decides to reveal the actuality. Moreover, the trio accuses her as a swindler. Later on, they understand her virtue including Raj and convince Jiya to stop her mother. Immediately, all of them rush to the function, by that time, Sunder Das mortifies Aasha seeking the whereabouts of Mr. Britannia. During that plight, Mrs. Chowdary comes forward, proclaims she is the one that is proof of Mr. Britannia’s existence and announces Raj’s wedding with Jiya. As well, the trio, declares as the men safeguarded by Mr. Britannia. Finally, the movie ends with a happy note the trio leaving back and Jiya gives them a warm sendoff.

Cast
Rekha as Asha aka Mrs. Britannia
Jeetendra as Sunil Malik
Randhir Kapoor as Kumar Sinha
Rakesh Roshan as Amar Khanna
Shashikala as Mrs. Chaudhary
Shubha Khote as Maria
Asrani as Johny
Rahat Khan as Raj Chaudhary
Sanober Kabir as Jiya
Altaf Raja as himself
Tirlok Malik
Mushtaq Khan as Sunder Das
Dinesh Hingoo as Dhanraj
Nishigandha Wad as Mrs. Sinha
Prabha Sinha
Saadhika Randhawa in special appearance
Fatima Sheikh

Soundtrack 
All songs written by Sameer.

References

External links
 

1999 films
Films scored by Dilip Sen-Sameer Sen
1990s Hindi-language films
Films directed by Saawan Kumar Tak
Indian romantic comedy films